Juan Manuel 'Juanma' Acevedo Marín (born 24 March 1992) is a Spanish footballer who plays as a left winger for UD Socuéllamos.

Club career
Born in Sant Vicent del Raspeig, Alicante, Acevedo finished his graduation in lowly Torrellano Illice CF's youth setup, and made his senior debuts with Elche CF's reserve team in the 2011–12 season. In December 2011 he was called up to train with the first team by manager José Bordalás.

In the 2012 summer Acevedo joined FC Jove Español San Vicente, but was assigned to the B-side. A year later he moved to Hércules CF, after the assignment of Jove Español as farm team; however, he was assigned to the B-team in the regional leagues.

On 30 March 2014 Acevedo played his first match as a professional, coming on as a second-half substitute in a 1–1 draw at Real Jaén in the Segunda División. In August, he was definitely promoted to the main squad, now in the Segunda División B.

References

External links

Juanma Acevedo at La Prefente

1992 births
Living people
People from Alacantí
Sportspeople from the Province of Alicante
Spanish footballers
Footballers from the Valencian Community
Association football midfielders
Segunda División players
Segunda División B players
Tercera División players
Elche CF Ilicitano footballers
Hércules CF B players
Hércules CF players
Huércal-Overa CF players
CD Castellón footballers
Águilas FC players